Asia Theological Association (ATA) is a Christian organisation of seminaries in Asia. It is a member of the International Council for Evangelical Theological Education. The headquarters is in Quezon City, Philippines.

History
ATA was formally established in 1970 as a direct outcome of the Asia-South Pacific Congress of Evangelism held in Singapore in 1968. Its primary goal was to develop "evangelical scholars, thinkers and teachers" for the leadership of the Asian church.

Accreditation services were rendered to institutions in 1978. Since then, it has developed in serving its member theological institutions in teaching evangelical biblical theology and in the training of Christian pastors and church workers. Its operating principles include strengthening partnership, enhancing scholarship, furthering academic excellence, fostering spiritual and ministerial formation, and mobilising resources to fulfil global Christian mission within diverse Asian cultures. The main reason for the establishment of ATA was to be an aid to theological institutions in contextualising theology in the Asian context. Through this Christian pastors and Christian churches can be aided to be more effective in supporting Christian ministry more effectively with other Asians in their own context. Today the majority of Evangelical seminaries in Asia are members of ATA.

The ATA's Statement of Faith indicates that theologically it "follows mainstream evangelicalism in the west."

Legal status
It is a member of the International Council for Evangelical Theological Education. 

Asia Theological Association accredits theological seminaries in the Asian region. However, not all seminaries accredited by ATA are recognised by the respective government. 

In India, no seminaries are recognized by the University Grants Commission therefore, ATA degrees and doctorates are not  recognized  under Section 22 of  the UGC Act. Since there are no government or UGC approved Seminaries or Divinity Schools in India that provide degrees in biblical languages and Christian theology, the degrees accredited by ATA institutions are recognised by Universities and Seminaries outside of Indian peninsular, especially in Europe, Australia and North America.
 
ATA is the Asian sponsor of the International Council for Evangelical Theological Education (ICETE), the theological education network covering all the continents that operates under the auspices of the World Evangelical Alliance (WEA). This effectively partners ATA with established accreditation bodies from other regions of the world, such as The Association for Biblical Higher Education (ABHE) in North America.

Publications
The ATA published two journals: the Journal of Asian Evangelical Theology and the Journal of Asian Mission. Both are published twice a year.

Some Accredited Institutions
 Alliance Bible Seminary
 Asia Graduate School of Theology
 Baekseok University
 China Lutheran Seminary
 Chongshin University
 Chung Yuan Christian University
 East Asia School of Theology
 Jerusalem University College
 Malaysia Baptist Theological Seminary
 Reformed Theological Seminary, Seoul 
 South Asia Institute of Advanced Christian Studies
 Tokyo Christian University
 Torch Trinity Graduate University

References

External links 

School accreditors
Educational institutions established in 1970
Evangelicalism in Asia
Evangelical organizations established in the 20th century
Christian organizations established in 1970
College and university associations and consortia in the Philippines